The Oku mouse shrew (Myosorex okuensis) is a species of mammal in the family Soricidae endemic to Cameroon.  Its natural habitat is subtropical or tropical moist montane forests.

References

Myosorex
Mammals of Cameroon
Endemic fauna of Cameroon
Mammals described in 1968
Taxonomy articles created by Polbot
Fauna of the Cameroonian Highlands forests